Ariadna abandonada is a sculpture by Fidencio Lucano Nava (1869–1938). There is a statue in the collection of Museo Nacional de Arte, and a statue installed across from Alameda Central, in Mexico City.

References

External links

 

Nude sculptures
Outdoor sculptures in Mexico City
Sculptures of women in Mexico
Statues in Mexico City